The Turkic people in Afghanistan are Turkic people from modern day Afghanistan. The major Turkic tribes are the Qizilbash, Uzbeks, Kyrgyz, Turkmens and Hazaras. The Qizilbash came to Afghanistan during the Afsharid and Durrani rule in Afghanistan and since they worked at high government jobs, but also made up parts of the army, especially when Timur Shah Durrani wanted to get rid of the dependency on Pashtun tribes and expanded his army by 12.000 Qizilbash soldier. Zaman Shah Durranis cavalry consisted of 100.000 men, who were mostly Qizilbashs. Today they live in big cities like Kabul, Mazar e Sharif and Kandahar. Currently they speak mainly Persian as their language, however in some regions, as in Kandahar, they also speak Pashto. They speak the same language as their ethnic equivalents in Central Asia. In addition to that the Kyrgyz people settle the Wakhan Corridor of Afghanistan and are really isolated there. The number of them  was 1,130 in 2003, all from eastern Wakhan District in the Badakhshan Province of northeastern Afghanistan. They still lead a nomadic lifestyle and are led by a khan or tekin. Some economic ties exist between Turkey and Uzbek people in Northern-Afghanistan and there are Turkish police trainers in Maidan Wardak, in the east of the country.

See also 
 Turkic history
 Tanoli

References 

History of the Turkic peoples
Ethnic groups in Afghanistan